A black panther is a colour variant of any Panthera, particularly of the leopard and the jaguar. 

Black panther, Black Panther or Black Panthers may also refer to:

Political organisations

Original U.S. organisations
Black Panther Party (1966–1982), a Black Power political organisation
Lowndes County Freedom Organization 1965–1970, also Black Panther party, a political party in Alabama

Others

 British Black Panthers (1968 –1973), a black power organisation in the United Kingdom inspired by the Black Panther Party
 Black Panthers (Israel) (1971–1990s), a former Israeli protest movement
 Australian Black Panther Party (1972–?), founded by Aboriginal Australian activists Sam Watson and Denis Walker in Queensland
 New Black Panther Party (founded 1989), an American black nationalist organisation in Dallas, Texas, not affiliated with the original
 Revolutionary Black Panther Party (founded 1991; claims continuity with the BPP), American organisation 
 New Afrikan Black Panther Party (founded 2005), an American Marxist–Leninist–Maoist organisation largely based in Red Onion State Prison in Wise County, Virginia

Arts, entertainment and media

In Marvel Comics and Marvel Entertainment
 Black Panther (character), a comic-book superhero
 Black Panther (TV series), 2010

Marvel Cinematic Universe
 One of the films in the Marvel Cinematic Universe's Black Panther series:
 Black Panther (film), 2018
 Black Panther: Wakanda Forever, 2022
 One of the characters who have held the mantle of the Black Panther in the Marvel Cinematic Universe:
 T'Challa (Marvel Cinematic Universe)
 Shuri (Marvel Cinematic Universe)
 T'Chaka (Marvel Cinematic Universe)
 N'Jadaka (Marvel Cinematic Universe) (aka Killmonger)
 Black Panther suit (Marvel Cinematic Universe)

Other films
 The Black Panther (1921 film), a silent German film 
 The Black Panther (1977 film), a British crime film about Donald Neilson
 Black Panthers (film), a 1968 short documentary film
 The Black Panthers: Vanguard of the Revolution, a 2015 film

Video games
 Black Panther (video game), 1987
 Kurohyō: Ryū ga Gotoku Shinshō, translated as "Black Panther: Like a Dragon New Chapter"
 Kurohyō 2: Ryū ga Gotoku Ashura-hen, the sequel to the above game

Other media
 Black Panther (band), a Chinese rock band
 The Black Panther (newspaper), official newspaper of the Black Panther Party

Heraldry
 Black panther (symbol), a heraldic emblem of Carantania, Carinthia and Slovenia

Military

 8th Tactical Fighter Squadron (JASDF), Japan, nicknamed "Black Panthers"
 1st Scout Ranger Regiment, formerly nicknamed "Black Panthers"
 K2 Black Panther, a South Korean main battle tank
 Royal Thai Army Expeditionary Division, known as "Black Panthers" in the Vietnam War
 761st Tank Battalion (United States) (1942–1955), nicknamed "Black Panthers"
 66th Infantry Division (United States), nicknamed "Black Panther Division"
 INAS 303, nicknamed "The Black Panthers"
 No. 37 Squadron IAF, Indian Air Force nicknamed "Black Panthers"
 No. 16 Squadron PAF, Pakistan Air Force squadron nicknamed "Black Panthers"
 Second VA-35 (U.S. Navy), nicknamed "Black Panthers"
 501st Bombardment Squadron, nicknamed "Black Panthers"
 13th Special Mission Brigade "Black Panther", see

People
 Black Panther (wrestler), the ring name of a Mexican wrestler of unrevealed identity
 Donald Neilson (1936–2011), alias the Black Panther, a British armed robber and murderer
 Eusébio (Eusébio da Silva Ferreira, 1942–2014), or the Black Panther, a Portuguese footballer
 Fritz Joubert Duquesne (1877–1956), a South African Boer spy known as Black Panther

See also
 
 Panther (disambiguation)
 Bay Area Panthers, an American indoor football team